Gary Hanson may refer to:

Gary D. Hanson (born 1949), former Democratic member of the South Dakota Senate
Gary W. Hanson (born 1950), South Dakota Public Utilities Commissioner and former Republican member of the South Dakota Senate

See also
Gary Hansen (born c. 1958), American macroeconomist